Suchcice  is a village in the administrative district of Gmina Drużbice, within Bełchatów County, Łódź Voivodeship, in central Poland. This village has monumental church of saint Ignatius of Loyola.

References

Villages in Bełchatów County